WBPE may refer to:

 WBPE (FM), a radio station (95.3 FM) licensed to serve Brookston, Indiana, United States
 UDP-2-acetamido-2-deoxy-ribo-hexuluronate aminotransferase, an enzyme